Thomas McNaught (born 26 July 1993) is an English filmmaker from Liverpool, England. His first notable project is his BBC Three Fresh featured short documentary Alice: Ignorance is Bliss, which follows the relationship between his 84-year-old dementia suffering grandmother and himself. It was nominated for Best British Short Film at the 28th Leeds International Film Festival, where it received a special mention.

Since 2011, McNaught has twice collaborated with Mark Gill and Baldwin Li of Honlodge Productions, providing unit videography for their BAFTA and Oscar-nominated short film The Voorman Problem as well as their first feature film England is Mine, a biopic following the early life of Steven Patrick Morrissey, frontman of  The Smiths.

Filmography

References

External links
 Official website
 
 
 

British filmmakers
1993 births
Living people